The Temple of Apollo, also known as Apollonion, was a sanctuary which occupied the most important and prominent position in Ancient Greece. Located in Delphi, the temple was dedicated to Apollo, the god of music, harmony, light, and healing. The edifice with the partially restored colonnade visible today dates to the 20th century BC and, according to ancient accounts, five different temples were built throughout history. The famous oracle, the Pythia, (also known as the Oracle of Delphi) operated inside the temple, the location chosen, according to one tradition, due to a sacred chasm beneath the site emitting vapours, which were inhaled by the Pythia.

Location 
Located on Mount Parnassos in Central Greece, the Temple of Apollo at Delphi is part of the Panhellenic Sanctuary at Delphi and occupies a remote, but central location relative to Greek settlements. The temple's heightened position upon the mountain signifies both the prominence of Apollo and the sanctuary itself. According to measurements believed to be created by Zeus, Delphi was the center of the universe for Greeks, and the “omphalos” or “navel,” of the earth was located in Apollo's sacred temple. Far from the influence of particular cities, but still central, the location of the sanctuary reinforces its Panhellenic nature and contributes to the idea that Apollo could be trusted as a neutral authority. Given its central location and difficult accessibility, the Temple of Apollo at Delphi was no ordinary site, but a place close to the gods.

History

Mythology 
According to mythological legend, Apollo famously killed Python, the dragon that previously guarded the oracle, as the sun rose from the ravines of Delphi. After the god took possession of the oracle, Apollo, along with his mother, Leto, and his sister, Artemis, would be worshipped at Delphi.

The five temples 
Greek traditions, and the writings of Pausanias in his Description of Greece of the second century CE, indicate five different temples were built to honor Apollo at Delphi. Some historians suggest the first three temples were constructed prior to the Homeric poems and before the cult of Apollo was established.

The first and most ancient temple, according to Pausanias, was similar to a hut and was made of branches from the bay tree. This tradition may be the result of later intervention, according to archaeologist J. Henry Middleton, who questions if the legend was reworked to connect the first temple of Apollo with bay laurel. The bay plant is closely associated with Apollo because it was used to purify the god after he killed Python.

Pausanias says the second temple was a gift from Apollo to the Hyperboreans, the oracle's original founders according to legend, and was constructed by bees with feathers and beeswax. Archaeologists assume bird feathers were used to construct the temple, but Pausanias does not clarify. Another story suggests Pteras, a Delphian man, used fern to build the second temple, a version Pausanias does not accept.

The third temple was said to be made of bronze and built by Hephaestus, according to myth, Pausanias believed the temple was bronze but doubted it was the work of Hephaestus. Two stories exists explaining its collapse, one suggests the temple was destroyed in a fire and the other says it fell into a deep fissure of the earth.

The fourth temple was stone, built by Trophonius and Agamedes, and was said to be burned accidentally in 548 B.C, during the time Erxicleides ruled Athens. Historians suggests the fourth temple was the first sanctuary during the time of Apollo at Delphi, and the temple referred to in mythology. Apollo left Olympus and visited many lands before deciding on a home at Delphi, according to Homeric hymn, and there he would be an oracle in his temple.

According to the Delphi Archaeological Museum, the Sphinx of Naxos, which sits on a tall column guarding Apollo's sanctuary, was built around 560 B.C.

The fifth and final temple was originally built in 510 B.C, but had to be reconstructed after an earthquake. The original Alkmaeonid temple, completed by about 511 B.C at the latest, was of the Doric order, with a six by fifteen column peristyle (surrounding colonnade). The sculpted decoration of its pediments was the work of the Athenian sculptor Antenor. The east pediment depicted Apollo's arrival at Delphi in triumph on his four-horse chariot. The west pediment depicted the battle between gods and giants (gigantomachy). The earthquake destroyed this temple in 373 B.C. Inaugurated in 330 B.C (43 years after the earthquake), the restored temple was also of Doric order, on the same footprint as its predecessor, and made of marble-coated porous stone. Amphiktionic council held a meeting prior to the construction of the new temple and decided the cost of the new building would be split. A quarter of the payment was made by the people of Delphi, and the rest was collected as donations from other civilizations, such as other Greek states and Egypt. The architect, Spintharius of Corinth, was chosen by the council to construct a design created by members of the Alcmaeonidae family, a wealthy Athenian family who had been forcibly exiled from Athens by the tyrant Peisistratos.The temple, according to the design, was made of limestone and included white Parian marble columns. Pediments, built by the Athenians, Praxias and Androsthenes, occupied the east and west sides of the temple. The Eastern pediment included statues of Apollo, Latona, and Artemis standing along a rising and setting sun. The west pediment depicted the god Dionysos among his female votaries, the Thyiades. Persian shields taken as booty by the Athenians from the Battle of Marathon in 490 BC were attached to the temple's metopes along with Gallic shields, spoils of the repulse of Gauls during the 279 BC invasion.

Inscribed on a column in the pronaos (the porch before the temple's cella), according to ancient writers, were three of the Delphic maxims of the Seven Sages: ΓΝΩΘΙ ΣEΑΥΤΟΝ (KNOW THYSELF), ΜΗΔΕΝ ΑΓΑΝ (NOTHING IN EXCESS), and ΕΓΓΥΑ, ΠΑΡΑ ΔΑΤΗ (SURETY BRINGS RUIN) as well as the enigmatic Delphic symbol “Ε”.

The temple survived until AD 390, when the Roman emperor Theodosius I silenced the oracle by destroying the temple and most of the statues and works of art in the name of Christianity.   The site was completely destroyed by zealous Christians in an attempt to remove all traces of Paganism.

The ruins of this temple decay at a faster rate than some of the other ruins on the Southern slopes of Mount Parnassos. This is mostly due to the use of limestone, a softer material, along with porous stone.

Function 
The Temple of Apollo at Delphi functions as a Panhellenic sanctuary serving all Greek settlements. Archaeologist J. Henry Middleton suggests Delphi, the location of the temple, contributes to the sanctuary's Panhellenic nature because Delphi itself was a sacred space representing, in Greek view, a politically and religiously united Greece.

Political function 
Professor of classics at the University of Buffalo, Susan Guettel Cole, explains in her book, Landscapes, Gender, and Ritual Space, Apollo was a figure of authority in legal and political concerns. The god served Greek civilizations which sought his political support and protection from corrupt leadership. Citizens from different Greek settlements came to Delphi to receive Apollo's political guidance through his oracles, the Pythia. According to Cole, accounts also exist of Greek civilizations placing texts which contained resolutions of political conflict in the walls of the Temple of Apollo. Doing so intended to consecrate the political text and demonstrate these Greek laws derived from the Apollo's authority. Settlers from Ozolian Locris, a region in Ancient Greece, hung political text in the temple during the sixth century. The document contained laws of a newly established colony and it also put forth punishments for leaders exploiting such laws. Laws from Dreros and Gortyn, were infamously inscribed into the walls of Apollo's temple. The seventh century law from Dresos, and the sixth century law from Gortyn, both stated conditions and regulations for political offices in their civilizations.

Health service 
Cole writes that Apollo, also a Greek god of healing, settled disputes regarding pollution and approved plans for purification which were submitted to him and his oracle at Delphi. According to the book, a pollution law for the ancient city of Kyrene was supposedly delivered and voiced by Apollo himself. Capable of inflicting and relieving civilizations of plague, the Temple of Apollo at Delphi was also visited when seeking Apollo's help during large health disasters.

The Pythia 

The priestesses of Apollo, known as the Pythia, served as the oracles at the Temple of Apollo at Delphi. The Pythia are the mystical spouses of Apollo, according to historians, and the women who delivered the god's prophecies in his sacred temple. At the same time as Apollo, according to classical scholar, Kurt Latte, the Pythia also arrived at Delphi. Archaeologists and historians believe the oracle of Apollo was first stationed in what was called the sanctuary of the Earth, prior to the building of Apollo's sacred temple. According to historian Charles Seltman, and many other accounts, the Pythia were originally selected as virgins until one of the young females was raped in the temple, and future priestesses were required to be at least fifty years old, but still wore the dress of a young woman.

The oracular process of the Pythia went as follows: the inquirer comes to the Temple of Apollo at Delphi and offers a gift upon the altar located outside the building. Offerings were typically sacrificed animals such as goats, sheep, or bulls. If the Pythia decided an offering was sufficient, she would proceed to enter Apollo's temple and descend into a chamber below the sanctuary ground. She sits on a tripod in the chamber and is cleansed by water from the Castalian spring, which entered through a large chasm in the rock floor. Various accounts describe the emission of gases also arising from the chasm while others say burnt bay laurel leaves created the fumes. All reports state the Pythia inhaled the gases or fumes, drank from a silver bowl containing water from the Castalian spring, and held a branch of the bay laurel plant in her hand and, in doing so, the Pythia was brought to a state of delirium. In this tranced psychological state came the knowledge of Apollo which the Pythia would begin to voice in words which could not be understood. A priest standing above in the temple hears her voice through an opening in the floor and interprets the prophecy. The priest's interpretation of the prophecy was then delivered either verbally to the inquirer or, often in more important cases, were written by the priest on a bay laurel leaf. This interpretation is controversial, and has been challenged by scholars such as Joseph Fontenrose and Lisa Maurizio, who argue that the ancient sources uniformly represent the Pythia speaking intelligibly, and giving prophecies in her own voice.

The legitimacy of the oracular process which took place at the Temple of Apollo is debated by scholars. Authors of classics, C.R. Whittaker, and geologists, J.Z. De Boer and J.R. Hale, have concluded the accounts of the Pythia's experience are myth. There is no evidence of a large fissure or chasm in the ground under the temple, and there is no indication that consuming bay laurel leaves or water from the Castalian spring can induce an intoxicated state. Whittaker attributes these details to ancient authors' inability to understand myths which described the experiences of the Pythia. Some classical and archaeological scholars also suggest that inquiries were given to the Pythia as two options for two different courses of action, and she would choose the correct course of action while in her altered state, an interpretation better accepted by scholars.

Excavation 

In 1892, the first excavation at Delphi, known as the Great Excavation, took place. The French government, in 1891, granted the French School of Athens the rights to excavate and the process started in 1892 and ended in 1894. Archaeologist, Jean Théphille Homelle, lead the excavation of the entire site of Delphi, which included the Temple of Apollo. Excavation uncovered various artistic votives dedicated to Apollo. Offerings included buildings, statues, and bronze and marble structures. Most notable amongst the findings was a bronze statue known as the Charioteer of Delphi, a sculpture from a larger bronze structure and the remaining component of the arrangement. The Charioteer, according to the Delphi Archaeological Museum, was a gift from Polyzalos of Gela, dedicated to the site after a victorious trip to the Pythian Games. Another important discovery during excavation at the Temple of Apollo, was a sculpture depicting three women known as the "Dancers of Delphi," which accompanies the Charioteer in the Delphi Archaeological Museum. The head of the Sphinx of Naxos, also a part of the museum, was found in 1893.

In 1938, the French School of Athens would excavate again under the direction of archaeologist Robert Demangel and supervised by future secretary of the school, Pierre Amandry, and archaeologist, Pierre de La Coste-Messeliére. French excavators discovered two small cavities in the ground below Apollo's sacred temple. Pieces of ivory, bronze, and gold found in the two pits were evident of statues made of such materials. Statues depicted human figures with hair and accessories made of gold and faces and limbs made of ivory. Remains of the statues were preserved well and work began to reconstruct the aesthetics of the different statue features. Also found amongst the remains below the Temple of Apollo were gold slates with depictions of animals and mythological figures.

More recent geological study of the Temple of Apollo at Delphi have identified fractures and fault zones in the ground below the site. During a tectonic event, it is possible hydrocarbon gases were emitted from these fault zones and such gases can have intoxicating and psychoactive effects. Geological evidence also indicates that fractures below the temple have created possible passage for Castalian spring water to enter the temple. These geological discoveries may be the origins of accounts about the Pythia and the state of delirium they endured when delivering oracular prophecies.

See also
 List of Ancient Greek temples

References

External links
 Centre, UNESCO World Heritage. “Archaeological Site of Delphi.” UNESCO World Heritage Centre, https://whc.unesco.org/en/list/393/
“Sanctuary of Apollo at Delphi (Video).” Khan Academy, https://www.khanacademy.org/humanities/ancient-art-civilizations/greek-art/daedalic-archaic/v/delphi
Delphi (Site). http://www.perseus.tufts.edu/hopper/artifact?object=Site&name=Delphi

Ruins in Greece
Delphi
Ancient Greek buildings and structures in Delphi
Destroyed temples
4th-century BC religious buildings and structures
Persecution of pagans in the late Roman Empire